Crassula perfoliata is the type species of the genus Crassula, in the flowering plant family Crassulaceae, where it is placed in the subfamily Crassuloideae. It was first formally described by Linnaeus in 1753 as one of 10 species of Crassula. It is from South Africa.

Two varieties are recognized:
  C. perfoliata var. falcata (J.C.Wendl.) Toelken
  C. perfoliata var. heterotricha (Schinz) Toelken

Crassula perfoliata var. falcata, known as the airplane plant or airplane propellers, has gained the Royal Horticultural Society's Award of Garden Merit. As it does not tolerate freezing temperatures, in temperate zones it must be grown under glass using a cactus compost.

References

Bibliography 

 , see also Species Plantarum
 

perfoliata
Flora of South Africa
Plants described in 1753
Taxa named by Carl Linnaeus